Poles, or Polish people, are a West Slavic ethnic group and nation who share a common history, culture, the Polish language and are identified with the country of Poland in Central Europe. The preamble to the Constitution of the Republic of Poland defines the Polish nation as comprising all the citizens of Poland, regardless of heritage or ethnicity. The majority of Poles adhere to Roman Catholicism.

The population of self-declared Poles in Poland is estimated at 37,394,000 out of an overall population of 38,512,000 (based on the 2011 census), of whom 36,522,000 declared Polish alone. A wide-ranging Polish diaspora (the Polonia) exists throughout Europe, the Americas, and in Australasia. Today, the largest urban concentrations of Poles are within the Warsaw and Silesian metropolitan areas.

Ethnic Poles are considered to be the descendants of the ancient West Slavic Lechites and other tribes that inhabited the Polish territories during the late antiquity period. Poland's recorded history dates back over a thousand years to  930–960 AD, when the Western Polans – an influential tribe in the Greater Poland region – united various Lechitic clans under what became the Piast dynasty, thus creating the first Polish state. The subsequent Christianization of Poland by the Catholic Church, in 966 CE, marked Poland's advent to the community of Western Christendom. However, throughout its existence, the Polish state followed a tolerant policy towards minorities resulting in numerous ethnic and religious identities of the Poles, such as Polish Jews.

Exonyms 

The Polish endonym Polacy is derived from the Western Polans, a Lechitic tribe which inhabited lands around the River Warta in Greater Poland region from the mid-6th century onward. The tribe's name stems from the Proto-Indo European *pleh₂-, which means flat or flatland and corresponds to the topography of a region that the Western Polans initially settled. The prefix pol- is used in most world languages when referring to Poles (Spanish polaco, Italian polacche, French polonais, German Pole).

These stem from Lechia, the ancient name for Poland, or from the tribal Lendians. Their names are equally derived from the Old Polish term lęda, meaning plain or field.

Ethnogenesis

Slavs have been in the territory of modern-day Poland for over 1500 years. During the Migration Period, central Europe was becoming increasingly settled by the early Slavs (500–700 AD). They organized into tribal units, of which the larger ones further west were later known as the Polish tribes (Lechites); the names of many tribes are found on the list compiled by the anonymous Bavarian Geographer in the 9th century. In the 9th and 10th centuries the tribes gave rise to developed regions along the upper Vistula (the Vistulans), the Baltic Sea coast and in Greater Poland. The ultimate tribal undertaking (10th century) resulted in a lasting political structure and the creation of a Polish state.

Language 

Polish is the native language of most Poles. It is a West Slavic language of the Lechitic group and the sole official language in the Republic of Poland. Its written form uses the Polish alphabet, which is the basic Latin alphabet with the addition of six diacritic marks, totalling 32 letters. Bearing relation to Czech and Slovak, it has been profoundly influenced by Latin, German and other languages over the course of history. Poland is linguistically homogeneous – nearly 97% of Poland's citizens declare Polish as their mother tongue.

Polish-speakers use the language in a uniform manner throughout most of Poland, though numerous dialects and a vernacular language in certain regions coexist alongside standard Polish. The most common lects in Poland are Silesian, spoken in Upper Silesia, and Kashubian, widely spoken in historic Eastern Pomerania (Pomerelia), today in the northwestern part of Poland. Kashubian possesses its own status as a separate language. The Goral people in the mountainous south use their own nonstandard dialect, accenting and different intonation.

The geographical distribution of the Polish language was greatly affected by the border changes and population transfers that followed the Second World War – forced expulsions and resettlement during that period contributed to the country's current linguistic homogeneity.

Culture 

The culture of Poland is closely connected with its intricate 1,000-year history, and forms an important constituent in the Western civilisation. Strong ties with the Latinate world and the Roman Catholic faith also shaped Poland's cultural identity.

Officially, the national and state symbol is the white-tailed eagle (bielik) embedded on the Coat of arms of Poland (godło). The national colours are white and red, which appropriately appear on the flag of Poland (flaga), banners, cockades and memorabilia.

Personal achievement and education plays an important role in Polish society today. In 2018, the Programme for International Student Assessment ranked Poland 11th in the world for mathematics, science and reading. Education has been of prime interest to Poland since the early 12th century, particularly for its noble classes. In 1364, King Casimir the Great founded the Kraków Academy, which would become Jagiellonian University, the second-oldest institution of higher learning in Central Europe. People of Polish birth have made considerable contributions in the fields of science, technology and mathematics both in Poland and abroad, among them Vitello, Nicolaus Copernicus, Marie Skłodowska–Curie, Rudolf Modrzejewski, Rudolf Weigl, Bronisław Malinowski, Stefan Banach, Stanisław Ulam, Leonid Hurwicz, Benoit Mandelbrot and Alfred Tarski. 

Poland's folk music, especially the mazurka, krakowiak and polonaise, were popularized by Polish composer Frédéric Chopin, and they soon spread across Europe and elsewhere. Latin songs and religious hymns such as Gaude Mater Polonia and Bogurodzica were once chanted in churches and during patriotic festivities, but the tradition has faded.

According to a 2020 study, Poland ranks 12th globally on a list of countries which read the most, and approximately 79% of Poles read the news more than once a day, placing it 2nd behind Sweden. As of 2021, six Poles received the Nobel Prize in Literature. The national epic is Pan Tadeusz (English: Master Thaddeus), written by Adam Mickiewicz. Renowned novelists who gained much recognition abroad include Joseph Conrad (wrote in English; Heart of Darkness, Lord Jim), Stanisław Lem (science-fiction; Solaris) and Andrzej Sapkowski (fantasy; The Witcher).

Various regions in Poland such as Greater Poland, Lesser Poland, Mazovia, Silesia, and Pomerania developed their own distinct cultures, cuisines, folk costumes and dialects. Also, Poland for centuries was a refuge to many Jews and to Armenians, who became an important part of Polish society and similarly developed their own unique cultures. 

Popular everyday foods in Poland include pork cutlets (kotlet schabowy), schnitzels, kielbasa sausage, potatoes, coleslaw and salads, soups (barszcz, tomato or meat broth), pierogi dumplings, and bread rolls. Traditional Polish cuisine is hearty and Poles are one of the more obese nations in Europe – approximately 58% of the adult population was overweight in 2019, above the EU average. According to data from 2017, meat consumption per capita in Poland was one of the highest in the world, with pork being the most in demand. Alcohol consumption is relatively moderate compared to other European states; popular alcoholic beverages include Polish-produced beer, vodka and ciders.

Religion 

Poles have traditionally adhered to the Christian faith; an overwhelming  majority belongs to the Roman Catholic Church, with 87.5% of Poles in 2011 identifying as Roman Catholic. According to Poland's Constitution, freedom of religion is ensured to everyone. It also allows for national and ethnic minorities to have the right to establish educational and cultural institutions, institutions designed to protect religious identity, as well as to participate in the resolution of matters connected with their cultural identity.

There are smaller communities primarily comprising Protestants (especially Lutherans), Orthodox Christians (migrants), Jehovah's Witnesses, those irreligious, and Judaism (mostly from the Jewish populations in Poland who have lived in Poland prior to World War II) and Sunni Muslims (Polish Tatars). Roman Catholics live all over the country, while Orthodox Christians can be found mostly in the far north-eastern corner, in the area of Białystok, and Protestants in Cieszyn Silesia and Warmia-Masuria regions. A growing Jewish population exists in major cities, especially in Warsaw, Kraków and Wrocław. Over two million Jews of Polish origin reside in the United States, Brazil, and Israel.

Religious organizations in the Republic of Poland can register their institution with the Ministry of Interior and Administration creating a record of churches and other religious organizations who operate under separate Polish laws. This registration is not necessary; however, it is beneficial when it comes to serving the freedom of religious practice laws.

Slavic Native Faith (Rodzimowiercy) groups, registered with the Polish authorities in 1995, are the Native Polish Church (Rodzimy Kościół Polski), which represents a pagan tradition going back to Władysław Kołodziej's 1921 Holy Circle of Worshippers of Światowid (Święte Koło Czcicieli Światowida), and the Polish Slavic Church (Polski Kościół Słowiański). There is also the Native Faith Association (Zrzeszenie Rodzimej Wiary, ZRW), founded in 1996.

Geographic distribution 

Polish people are the sixth-largest national group in the European Union (EU). Estimates vary depending on source, though available data suggest a total number of around 60 million people worldwide (with roughly 18-20 million living outside of Poland, many of whom are not of Polish descent, but are Polish nationals). There are almost 38 million Poles in Poland alone. There are also strong Polish communities in neighbouring countries, whose territories were once occupied or part of Poland – Czech Republic, Slovakia, Lithuania, Latvia, western Ukraine, and western Belarus.

The term "Polonia" is usually used in Poland to refer to people of Polish origin who live outside Polish borders. There is a notable Polish diaspora in the United States, Brazil, and Canada. France has a historic relationship with Poland and has a relatively large Polish-descendant population. Poles have lived in France since the 18th century. In the early 20th century, over a million Polish people settled in France, mostly during world wars, among them Polish émigrés fleeing either Nazi occupation (1939–1945) or Communism (1945/1947–1989).

In the United States, a significant number of Polish immigrants settled in Chicago (billed as the world's most Polish city outside of Poland), Milwaukee, Ohio, Detroit, New Jersey, New York City, Orlando, Pittsburgh, Buffalo, and New England. The highest concentration of Polish Americans in a single New England municipality is in New Britain, Connecticut. The majority of Polish Canadians have arrived in Canada since World War II. The number of Polish immigrants increased between 1945 and 1970, and again after the end of Communism in Poland in 1989. In Brazil, the majority of Polish immigrants settled in Paraná State. Smaller, but significant numbers settled in the states of Rio Grande do Sul, Espírito Santo and São Paulo (state). The city of Curitiba has the second largest Polish diaspora in the world (after Chicago) and Polish music, dishes and culture are quite common in the region.

A recent large migration of Poles took place following Poland's accession to the European Union in 2004 and with the opening of the EU's labor market; an approximate number of 2 million, primarily young, Poles taking up jobs abroad. It is estimated that over half a million Polish people went to work in the United Kingdom from Poland. Since 2011, Poles have been able to work freely throughout the EU where they have had full working rights since Poland's EU accession in 2004. The Polish community in Norway has increased substantially and has grown to a total number of 120,000, making Poles the largest immigrant group in Norway. Only in recent years has the population abroad decreased, specifically in the UK with 116.000 leaving the UK in 2018 alone. There is a large minority of Polish people in Ireland that makes up approximately 2.57% of the population.

See also 

 Demographics of Poland
 Karta Polaka
 Lechites
 List of Poles
 Names of Poland (etymology of the demonym)
 Pole and Hungarian brothers be
 Poles in France
 Poles in Germany
 Poles in Latvia
 Poles in Lithuania
 Poles in Norway
 Poles in Romania
 Poles in the Soviet Union
 Poles in Spain
 Poles in the United Kingdom
 Polish Americans
 Polish Argentines
 Polish Australians
 Polish Brazilians
 Polish Canadians
 Polish Chileans
 Polish Mexicans
 Polish minority in Ireland
 Polish Czechs
 Polish nationality law
 Polish New Zealanders
 Polish Uruguayans
 Polish Venezuelans
 Polonization
 Sons of Poland
 West Slavs

Notes

References 

 
Ethnic groups in Poland
Slavic ethnic groups
Lechites
West Slavs